The White Resistance Manual is a white supremacist handbook which is similar to The Anarchist Cookbook. It promotes the founding of small independent white supremacist cells, and it is also an instruction manual on how to perform illegal activities such as weapon-making and terrorism, in addition to violent guerrilla warfare against the Government. The book was popular on neo-Nazi websites until it attracted media and law enforcement attention, causing many sites to take it down. Anarchist activist Sherman Austin said of the book:
There’s something on the Internet called the White Resistance Manual. It’s pretty much for white supremacists…to carry out a large-scale guerilla campaign through means of assassination, threats, obtaining funds through fraud, everything from firearms to explosives. I’ve seen, not surprisingly, no action taken against those people, but here I am, an anarchist website, not even close to what that is, not even close to what else you can find on the Internet.

Possession of the manual is illegal in the United Kingdom.

Footnotes

Books about terrorism
Political books